Wadsworth is a surname. Notable persons with that surname include:

Adelaide E. Wadsworth (1844-1928), American painter
Alexander S. Wadsworth (1790–1851), U.S. Navy officer; fought in the War of 1812; eponym of three ships
Alexander Wadsworth (landscape designer) (1806–1898), helped design Mount Auburn Cemetery
Alfred Powell Wadsworth (1890/91-1956), British journalist, editor of The Guardian
Andre Wadsworth (born 1974), American football player
Benjamin Wadsworth (1670–1737), American clergyman and educator; president of Harvard University
Charles Wadsworth (contemporary), American classical pianist and musical promoter
Daniel Wadsworth (1771–1848), American artist, arts patron, and founder of the Wadsworth Atheneum Museum of Art
Decius Wadsworth (1768–1821) U.S. Army officer and cryptologist; developed a progressive cipher system
Derek Wadsworth (1939–2008), British composer and arranger
Edward Wadsworth (1889–1949), British artist
E. S. Wadsworth (1813–1890), American merchant
Eleanor Wadsworth (1917-2020), was the oldest surviving pilot of the Air Transport Auxiliary (ATA) before her death in December 2020.
Elijah Wadsworth (1747–1817) American Militia officer during the Revolutionary War and Major General during the War of 1812, early pioneer of Ohio
Frank W. Wadsworth (1919–2012), American Shakespearean scholar, author, and sportsman
Frederick Wadsworth (1786–1869), American businessman and politician
George Wadsworth (1893–1958), American diplomat; specialized in the Middle East
George Wadsworth (1902–1979), British politician; MP for the East Riding of Yorkshire
James Wadsworth (1730–1816), American general in the Revolution; delegate to the Continental Congress
James Wadsworth (of Geneseo) (1768–1844) American pioneer, land agent, philanthropist
James S. Wadsworth (1807–1864), American politician, philanthropist, and general in the Civil War
James Wadsworth (1819–1891) American businessman and Mayor of Buffalo, New York
James Wolcott Wadsworth (1846–1926), American politician; U.S. representative from New York
James Wolcott Wadsworth Jr. (1877–1952), American politician; U.S. representative and U.S. Senator from New York
James Jeremiah Wadsworth (1905–1984), U.S. diplomat; ambassador to the UN
Jeremiah Wadsworth (1743–1804), American sea captain; delegate to the Continental Congress; U.S. representative from Connecticut
Harrison Wadsworth, Jr. (1924-2010) American engineering professor of statistical methods, author and pioneer in quality control science
Ken Wadsworth (1946–1976), New Zealand cricketer
Mabel Sine Wadsworth (1910-2006), American birth control activist and women's health educator
Marc Wadsworth, British anti-racist campaigner
Martha Wadsworth Brewster (1710 – c. 1757), American poet and writer.
Michael Wadsworth (contemporary), British sociologist and socio-medical researcher
Mick Wadsworth (born 1950), British football coach
Peleg Wadsworth (1748–1829), U.S. Army officer in the American Revolution; grandfather of Henry Wadsworth Longfellow
Philip Wadsworth (1832–1901), American merchant and politician
Priscilla Wadsworth, American artist
Walter Wadsworth (1890–1951), British football player
William Wadsworth (1594–1675), British Puritan, American colonial pioneer, co-founder of Hartford, Connecticut, ancestor of the poet Ezra Pound
William Wadsworth (1765–1833), Brigadier General of New York Militia in the War of 1812

English-language surnames